Naga City may refer to these places in the Philippines:

Naga, Camarines Sur
Naga, Cebu

See also
 Naga (disambiguation)